The Pact of Umar (also known as the Covenant of Umar, Treaty of Umar or Laws of Umar;  or  or ), is a treaty between the Muslims and the non-Muslim inhabitants of either Syria, Mesopotamia, or Jerusalem that later gained a canonical status in Islamic jurisprudence. It specifies rights and restrictions for dhimmis, or "people of the book," a type of protected class of non-Muslim peoples recognized by Islam which includes Jews, Christians, Zoroastrians, and several other recognized faiths living under Islamic rule. 
There are several versions of the pact, differing both in structure and stipulations. While the pact is traditionally attributed to the second Rashidun Caliph Umar ibn Khattab, other jurists and orientalists have questioned this attribution with the treaty being instead attributed to 9th century Mujtahids (Islamic scholars) or the Umayyad Caliph Umar II. This treaty should not be confused with  Umar's Assurance of safety to the people of Aelia (known as al-ʿUhda al-ʿUmariyya).

In general, the pact contains a list of rights and restrictions on non-Muslims (dhimmis). By abiding by them, non-Muslims are granted the security of their persons, their families, and their possessions. Other rights and stipulations may also apply. According to Ibn Taymiyya, one of the jurists who accepted the authenticity of the pact, the dhimmis have the right "to free themselves from the Covenant of 'Umar and claim equal status with the Muslims if they enlisted in the army of the state and fought alongside the Muslims in battle."

Origin and authenticity
The origins of the Pact of 'Umar are difficult, if not entirely impossible, to identify. Western scholars' opinions vary concerning the Pact's authenticity. According to Anver M. Emon, "There is intense discussion in the secondary literature" about the Pact's authenticity, with scholars disagreeing whether it originated during the reign of Umar b. al-Khattab ['Umar I] or was "a later invention retroactively associated with Umar -- the caliph who famously led the initial imperial expansion -- to endow the contract of dhimma with greater normative weight". Several historians suggest that the Pact was written not all at one time, but over the course of several centuries. Bernard Lewis, widely regarded as one of the leading scholars in Jewish history, describes the "official" origin of the Pact of 'Umar: "The Muslim historiographic tradition ascribes these regulations to the caliph 'Umar I (634-644)." He goes on to doubt the validity of this attribution, writing that the document "can hardly be authentic." Several key facets of the document and its history make the traditional attribution of the Pact of 'Umar to the Caliph 'Umar I doubtful—including its structure as a letter written from the conquered dhimmi to either Caliph 'Umar I or one of the generals in charge of the conquering Muslim forces, a lack of any physical texts dating back to the time of 'Umar I that either mention the Pact or his relation to it, and certain key phrases within the Pact that could only have addressed issues from a time after the rule of 'Umar I.

The structure of the Pact of 'Umar is unusual, given the purpose of the document was to restrict the rights of the dhimmi. The Pact of 'Umar has several different translations and versions, but each follow the same general format described above: a peace treaty written from the dhimmi to the conquering Muslim forces. A.S. Tritton includes several of these translations/versions in "Caliphs and their Non-Muslim Subjects: A Critical Study of the Covenant of 'Umar." Each of these versions begin with some variation of “When you came to us we asked of you safety for our lives… on these conditions...” and conclude with some form of “We impose these terms on ourselves and our co-religionists; he who rejects them has no protection." This format, a letter written from the conquered to the conquerors, is puzzling for a peace treaty. Given the purpose and importance of this document to Muslim rule in the Middle Ages, it is difficult to believe that it was written by the conquered peoples as a list of their own rights and the restrictions on those rights.

Mark R. Cohen explains the unusual format of the Pact of 'Umar by comparing it to other conquest treaties from throughout the Middle Ages, writing "The literary form of the Pact… becomes less mysterious if we view the document as a kind of petition from the losers promising submission in return for a decree of protection." Cohen thus attempts a comprehensive explanation for the puzzling format of the Pact of ‘Umar, but does not offer a clear answer to the question of the document’s origins, instead leaving the origin of the document as a matter of open debate. In leaving the subject open, Cohen supports the notion that the origins of this document are ambiguous at best, and has a format fitting with documents from later in the Middle Ages

Another important point to consider when studying the origins of this document is the inconsistency as to whom the document addressed. The document was typically addressed to the Caliph 'Umar, but not always directly. In some translations the Pact addresses a conquering general of the Muslim forces, such as Abu ‘Ubaida, “the chief commander in Syria and apparently from Damascus.”  If the document was not always addressed to the Caliph 'Umar I, suggests that it was written after his time, despite the traditional attribution of the Pact to his rule.

There is a lack of any physical documentation of the Pact of 'Umar from the time of Caliph 'Umar I. Cohen addresses this, writing that although the Pact is “attributed to the second caliph (‘Umar I)… no text of the document can be dated earlier than the tenth or eleventh century” - well after the death of ‘Umar I. Bernard Lewis supports this: “it is not unlikely that in this as in many other aspects of early Muslim administrative history, some measures that were really introduced or enforced by the Umayyad caliph ‘Umar II (717-720) are ascribed by pious tradition to the less controversial and more venerable ‘Umar I." Lewis thus identifies Caliph 'Umar II as a potential source for portions of the Pact of 'Umar, lending credence to the likelihood that the document was written over the course of time, not under a single ruler.

The content of the Pact seems to have developed in response to social and political issues cropping up between the dhimmi and their Muslim rulers over the course of the early and high Middle Ages. Certain portions of the Pact deal with social issues that did not arise until the 10th or 11th centuries, well after the time of Caliph ‘Umar I. An important part of the evolution of the Muslim people during the Middle Ages was their transition from a conquering people to a ruling people. During the time of ‘Umar I, Islam was in its early years and largely a society of conquering peoples. This meant that the majority of their legal focus was centered around defining their status as a small conquering minority over a larger conquered majority and ensuring that the conquered majority would not be able to interfere with their rule. Legal measures concerning the everyday rule and maintenance of their society only came later in the Middle Ages. Norman Stillman addresses this in an analysis of the content of the Pact of 'Umar, writing “many of the provisions and restrictions of the pact were only elaborated with the passage of time,” and that “certain provisions of the pact only applied to the early years of the Arab military occupation… other provisions were added to the pact when the Arabs became permanent settlers." Stillman identifies the document as a type of living document, growing to encompass increasing solutions to issues between the Muslim and dhimmi populations as they became apparent and as circumstances surrounding their relationship changed. As a treaty that likely changed over time, it is difficult to pinpoint a particular date or author as the origin of the Pact, one of the foremost reasons for this longstanding ambiguity.

As described, there is significant historical debate over the origins of the Pact of 'Umar. However, there is sufficient evidence to make the validity of the attribution of the Pact to one ruler or leader highly unlikely. Below are some examples of the varying opinions historians have over the origins of this debate.

A.S. Tritton is one scholar who has "suggested that the Pact is a fabrication" because later Muslim conquerors did not apply its terms to their agreements with their non-Muslim subjects, which they would have if the pact had existed earlier. Another scholar, Daniel C. Dennet, believes that the Pact was "no different from any other treaty negotiated in that period and that it is well within reason that the Pact we have today, as preserved in al-Tabari's chronicle is an authentic version of that early treaty." Historian Abraham P. Bloch writes that "Omar was a tolerant ruler, unlikely to impose humiliating conditions upon non-Muslims or to infringe upon their religious and social freedoms. His name has been erroneously associated…with the restrictive Covenant of Omar."

According to Thomas Walker Arnold, the pact "is in harmony [with Umar's] kindly consideration for his subjects of another faith, "A later generation attributed to ‘Umar a number of restrictive regulations which hampered the Christians in the free exercise of their religion, but De Goeje and Caetani have proved without doubt that they are the invention of a later age; as, however, Muslim theologians of less tolerant periods accepted these ordinances as genuine"

Content

There are several different versions of the pact that differ both in their language and stipulations.

The points:
 Prohibition against building new churches, places of worship, monasteries, or a new cell. (Hence it was also forbidden to build new synagogues. It is known that new synagogues were only built after the occupation of Islam, for example in Jerusalem and Ramle. A similar law, prohibiting the building of new synagogues, existed in the Byzantines, and was therefore not new for all Jews. It was new for the Christians.)
 Prohibition against rebuilding destroyed churches, by day or night, in their own neighbourhoods or those situated in Muslim quarters.
 The places of worship of non-Muslims must be lower in elevation than the lowest mosque in town.
 The houses of non-Muslims must not be taller in elevation than the houses of Muslims.
 Prohibition against hanging a cross on the outside of Churches.
 Muslims should be allowed to enter Churches (for shelter) at any time, both day and night.
 Obliging the call to prayer by a bell or a kind of Gong (Nakos) to be low in volume.
 Prohibition against Christians and Jews raising their voices at prayer times.
 Prohibition against teaching non-Muslim children the Qur'an.
 Christians forbidden to publicly display their religion, or to be seen with Christian books or symbols in public, on the roads or in the markets of the Muslims.
 Palm Sunday and Easter parades were banned.
 Funerals to be conducted quietly.
 Prohibition against burying non-Muslim dead near Muslims.
 Prohibition against raising a pig next to a Muslims neighbour.
 Christian were forbidden to sell alcoholic beverages to Muslims.
 Christians were forbidden to provide cover or shelter for spies.
 Prohibition against telling a lie about Muslims.
 Obligation to show deference toward Muslims. If a Muslim wishes to sit, the non-Muslim should rise from his seat and give it to the Muslim.
 Prohibition against preaching to Muslims in an attempt to convert them from Islam. 
 Prohibition against preventing the conversion to Islam of some one who wishes to convert.
 The appearance of non-Muslims has to be different from that of Muslims: Prohibition against wearing Qalansuwa (kind of cap that Bedouins used to wear), Bedouin turban (Amamh), Muslims shoes, and Sash to their waists. As to the head, it was forbidden for non-Muslims to comb the hair sidewise as was the Muslim custom, and they were forced to cut the hair at the front of the head. Also non-Muslims shall not imitate the Arab-Muslim way of speech nor shall adopt the kunyas (Arabic byname, such as "abu Khattib").
 Non-Muslims obliged to be identifiable by such signs as: clipping the heads' forelocks and by always dressing in the same manner, wherever they go, with binding the zunnar (a kind of belt) around the waists. Christians to wear blue belts or turbans, Jews to wear yellow belts or turbans, Zoroastrians to wear black belts or turbans, and Samaritans to wear red belts or turbans.
 Prohibition against riding animals in the Muslim manner, and prohibition against riding with a saddle.
 Prohibition against adopting a Muslim title of honour.
 Prohibition against engraving Arabic inscriptions on signet seals.
 Prohibition against the possession of weapons.
 Non-Muslims obliged to receive any passing Muslim as a guest in his home for at least 3 days and feed him.
 Non-Muslims prohibited from buying a Muslim prisoner.
 Prohibition against taking slaves who have been allotted to Muslims.
 Prohibition against non-Muslims leading, governing or employing Muslims.
 If a non-Muslim beats a Muslim, his Dhimmi protection is removed. 
 In return, the ruler would provide security for Christian believers who follow the rules of the pact.

See also
 Charter of Medina
 Ashtiname of Muhammad
 Outline of Islam
 Glossary of Islam
 Index of Islam-related articles
Religio licita
1782 Edict of Tolerance

Notes

References

 

Mark R. Cohen, and Norman A Stillman, “The Neo-Lachrymose Conception of Jewish-Arab History,”

External links
Text of one version of the Pact, in arabic and translated into French, commentary and translation by Ahmed Oulddali (2012).

Islamic jurisprudence
Christianity and Islam
Islam and other religions
Christianity in the Rashidun Caliphate
Christianity in the Umayyad Caliphate
Umar
Treaties of the Rashidun Caliphate